Ganpat Andalkar (born 15 April 1935) is an Indian wrestler. He competed in two events at the 1964 Summer Olympics. He was the recipient of the Arjuna Award in 1964 for his contribution to wrestling.

References

External links
 

1935 births
Living people
Indian male sport wrestlers
Olympic wrestlers of India
Wrestlers at the 1964 Summer Olympics
Asian Games medalists in wrestling
Wrestlers at the 1962 Asian Games
Asian Games gold medalists for India
Asian Games silver medalists for India
Medalists at the 1962 Asian Games
20th-century Indian people